David Anthony Chimhini was born on 10 June 1950 in Mutasa and is the MP for Mutasa North in Manicaland province, Zimbabwe. He is the father of George Chimhini, Shupikayi Chimhini. Hon. Chimhini has three wives.

He attended Nyanga High school, Marist Brothers for his high school education. Hon Chimhini then proceeded to Kutama College where he qualified as a teacher. Hon. Chimhini has a University of Zimbabwe Certificate in Education in addition to a teacher’s certificate from Kutama Teachers’ College. Hon Chimhini also has a Master of Arts Degree in Development Studies specialising in Labour and Development from the Institute of Social Studies – The Hague, Netherlands.

Whilst at the Institute of Social Studies in the Hague, Hon Chimhini was elected President of the Student Union. In the 1970s, Hon Chimhini taught and became a headmaster in the Manicaland and Mashonaland West provinces. He supported the nationalist insurgency during the Rhodesian Bush War by offering supplies to guerrillas. He later became involved in trade unionism and joined the Rhodesia African Teacher's Association.

In 1988 Chimhini was appointed the National Training Secretary for the Zimbabwe Teachers Association (ZIMTA). In 1992 he formed the Zimbabwe Human Rights Association with Reginald Matchaba-Hove, Nick Ndebele, and other activists. Chimhini was then appointed executive director of Zimrights in 1995 leading the organisation into its most successful period in its history. Under Hon leadership, ZimRights membership and profile grew rapidly. It became the biggest human rights organisation in Zimbabwe. Its membership steadily grew from 3,000 in 1995 to over 14,000 in 1998. One of the biggest demonstrations organised by ZimRights took place in Harare in 1995 under the leadership of David Chimhini, where protesters demonstrated against police brutality. In an inflammatory speech after the protest, President Mugabe labelled ZimRights "Zimlooters" and a "gangster organization".

Whilst at Zimrights Hon Chimhini was one of the founding members of the National Constitutional Assembly in 1997 together with Morgan Tsvangirai, Mike Auret, David Coltart, Tendai Biti, Thoko Matshe, Lovemore Madhuku, Welshman Ncube, Priscilla Misihairambwi, Brian Kagoro and many others. Hon Chimhini went on to serve on the NCA board as taskforce member representing Human Rights for the next 4 years. In September 1999 Hon Chimhini was part of the group from civic society that was instrumental in the formation of the Movement for Democratic Change. He was a member of the interim leadership and served in the management committee before the party's inaugural congress in January 2000.

Hon Chimhini left ZimRights in 1999 and went on to become the first National Coordinator of the MDC. In the year 2000, Hon Chimhini became a spokesman and National Coordinator of the United People for National Survival (UPNS), an organisation which mobilised people to protest against the destructive policies adopted by the Zimbabwe government. The organisation introduced the now famous red cards with the inscription 'Mugabe must go now'. Other members of UPNS were Wilfred Mhanda of the Zimbabwe Liberators Platform and Archbishop PIus Ncube. Late in the year 2000 Hon Chimhini formed the Zimbabwe Civic Education Trust, an organisation which is involved in peace building, conflict resolution, human rights awareness and civic education and became its founding executive director. Whist working in civic society Hon Chimhini was a board member of the ZESN (Zimbabwe Election Support Network), Centre for Peace Initiatives In Africa and many other organisations.

In March 2008 Hon Chimhini contested the Mutasa North seat under the MDC and won comfortably with 10,000 votes against 4,000 votes for Major-General Mike Nyambuya who was then Minister of transport and energy and represented ZANU–PF. In parliament Hon Chimhini is a member of the select committee on Education as well as Housing and Social Welfare portfolio committee. Hon Chimhini is the treasurer of the African Parliament Network Against Corruption (Zimbabwe Chapter).

Hon Chimhini has continued fighting for human rights and is a member of the ZIMCET board.

References
Nyambuya is a former army general. He served as Governor of Manicaland ... defeated in this election by David Chimhini, the candidate of the Movement for ...  en.wikipedia.org

displayarticle ... With David Chimhini. Listen to Interview With David Chimhini ... Executive Director David Chimhini of the Zimbabwe Civic Education Trust told ... www.voanews.com

displayarticle ... Discussion With David Chimhini and Dewa Mavhinga ... a human rights lawyer, and David Chimhini, director of the Zimbabwe Civic ... www.voanews.com

Amnesty International Dutch Section, Keizersgracht 620, PO Box 1968,1000 ... David Chimhini is the Executive Director of the Zimbabwe Human Rights ...  www.hrea.org

"It is public knowledge that the voter registration exercise is ... David Chimhini, the Zimcet executive director, said government was attempting to  ...  www.zwnews.com

How one organization brought opponents together to stop political violence ... According to director David Chimhini, the organization, founded in 2000, helped ...  www.oxfamamerica.org

allAfrica: African news and information for a global audience ... David Chimhini, the MDC MP elect for Mutasa North, said traditional leaders ...  allafrica.com

Source: United Nations Office for the Coordination of Humanitarian Affairs ... David Chimhini, candidate for the opposition party, the Movement for Democratic ...  www.reliefweb.int

allAfrica: African news and information for a global audience ... Zimcet director David Chimhini said at a time when the priority for most ... allafrica.com

HARARE, 31 August 2004 (IRIN) – In Zimbabwe's current political climate, peace ... ZIMCET director David Chimhini told IRIN that "there is a general sentiment that ... www.irinnews.org

... ZIMCET executive director David Chimhini says the peace committees were targeted ... www.kubatana.net

the world's leading ... The recently launched mobile registration exercise taking place ... David Chimhini, the Zimcet executive director, said government ... www.zwnews.com

HARARE, 2 April 2008 (IRIN) – The painful slowness of announcing the results of ... David Chimhini, candidate for the opposition party, the Movement for Democratic ... www.irinnews.org

We could have expected more in terms of preparations for such major elections, ... process," David Chimhini, candidate for the opposition party, the Movement for ... www.ocnus.net

Source: United Nations Office for the Coordination of Humanitarian Affairs ... David Chimhini, the director of the Zimbabwe Civic Education Trust (ZIMCET) ... www.reliefweb.int

Council for the Development of Social Science Research in Africa ... David Chimhini is the Executive Director of the Zimbabwe Human Rights ... 

World news clustered, updated every day. Explore the news, ... David Chimhini (1) Douglas Alexander (1) Ban Ki Moon (1) Kofi Annan (1) Levy Mwanawasa (1) ... press.jrc.it

The Zimbabwe Situation ... David Chimhini, spokesman for UPNS, said today: ... David CHIMHINI – Co-ordinator. Wilfred MHANDA – Representative of Zimbabwe ... www.zimbabwesituation.com

CFU Farm Invasions And Security Report – Friday 8 March 2002 ... "We believe that the voters' roll is in a shambles," David Chimhini, head of ... www.zimbabwesituation.com

World news clustered, updated every day. Explore the news, ... David Chimhini (1) Douglas Alexander (1) Tendai Uchena (1) Walter Marwizi (1) Byron Kelleher (1) ... press.jrc.it

GlobalSecurity.org is the leading source for reliable military news and ... David Chimhini, candidate for the opposition party, the Movement for Democratic ... www.globalsecurity.org

PlusNews is an online news and analysis service on HIV and AIDS. ... David Chimhini, candidate for the opposition party, the Movement for Democratic ... www.plusnews.org

... David Chimhini, director of the Civic Education Trust (ZIMCET), said they ... www.kubatana.net

Refworld is the leading source of information necessary for taking quality ... in announcing the results," David Chimhini, director of the Zimbabwe Civic ... www.unhcr.org

AlertNet provides news, information and analysis for everyone interested in ... in announcing the results," David Chimhini, director of the Zimbabwe Civic ... www.alertnet.org

AlertNet provides news, information and analysis for everyone interested in ... process," David Chimhini, candidate for the opposition party, the Movement for ... www.alertnet.org

HARARE, Apr 15 (IPS) - Emotions are running high in Zimbabwe as people discuss the correctness of vice-president ... says David Chimhini, director of ... www.aegis.com

GlobalSecurity.org is the leading source for reliable military news and ... David Chimhini, the director of the Zimbabwe Civic Education Trust (ZIMCET) ... www.globalsecurity.org

Organization ... The portal database architecture is compatible for English, French, ... David Chimhini. Address: P.O. Box 1858, Harare. Phone Number: +263-(0)4 ... www.peacebuildingportal.org

PlusNews is an online news and analysis service on HIV and AIDS. ... times of want, according to David Chimhini, president of the Zimbabwe Civic Education Trust. ... www.plusnews.org

Analysts confirmed last week that Zimbabwe cannot have free and fair polls next ... David Chimhini, executive director of the Zimbabwe Civic Education Trust, says ... www.sokwanele.com

Zambian president and SADC chair Levy Mwanawasa called the extraordinary meeting ... in announcing the results," David Chimhini, director of the Zimbabwe Civic ... www.pambazuka.org

General Editors: Prof. Karla Simon, Dr. Leon Irish ... David Chimhini (Zimbabwe) Prof. Vojin Dimitrijevic (Yugoslavia) Prof. David Goldberg (Scotland) ... www.icnl.org

Hunger is giving a brutal edge to the alleged work of militias ... times of want, according to David Chimhini, president of the Zimbabwe Civic Education Trust. ... mandebvhu.bundublog.com

Zimbabwean rights activists are campaigning with unprecedented vigour for an end to the death penalty as the country's ... David Chimhini, executive ... ipsnews.net

The following article was posted on the September 25, 2003 issue of the ... many other such things," said David Chimhini, the executive director of the ... security.pr.erau.edu

The painful slowness of announcing the results of Zimbabwe's 29 March poll is being condemned internationally as " ... David Chimhini, candidate for the ... wow.gm

Criticism from some regional leaders in the run-up to the summit had raised expectations within the two factions of the ... and David Chimhini, director of ... mensnewsdaily.com

zimsite: The meeting-place for Zimbabweans world-wide, ... Shamu said pamphlets signed by David Chimhini, a human rights activist, were ... groups.yahoo.com

Award winning blog by Mike Hitchen. International news, views, analysis focusing on international relations, international ... David Chimhini, the director of ... ionglobaltrends.blogspot.com

Members of the National Assembly of Zimbabwe
1950 births
Movement for Democratic Change – Tsvangirai politicians
20th-century Zimbabwean politicians
21st-century Zimbabwean politicians
Living people
People from Manicaland Province
University of Zimbabwe alumni